Waikato's Manganui River is located close to the west coast of New Zealand's North Island. It flows south, parallel to the coast of the North Taranaki Bight, before flowing into the Awakino River  from the latter's mouth.

See also 
 List of rivers of New Zealand

References 

Waitomo District
Rivers of Waikato
Rivers of New Zealand